The historiography of science or the historiography of the history of science is the study of the history and methodology of the sub-discipline of history, known as the history of science, including its disciplinary aspects and practices (methods, theories, schools) and the study of its own historical development ("History of History of Science", i.e., the history of the discipline called History of Science).

Historiographical debates regarding the proper method for the study of the history of science are sometimes difficult to demarcate from historical controversies regarding the course of science. Early controversies of the latter kind are considered by some to be the inception of the sub-discipline.

Amateur historiography of science 
Histories of science were originally written by practicing and retired scientists, a notable early example being William Whewell's History of the Inductive Sciences (1837). Biographies of natural philosophers (early scientists) were also popular in the nineteenth century, helping to create Isaac Newton as a scientific genius and national hero in Great Britain. H.G. Wells began a trend for histories of science on the grand scale, a kind of epic of civilisation and progress, with his Outline of History (1919/1920). Popular accounts of science's past were often linked to speculations about its future, with science fiction authors such as Isaac Asimov and L. Sprague de Camp dabbling in the two.

Professional historiography of science

Internalism and externalism 
In the early 1930s, a paper given by the Soviet historian Boris Hessen prompted many historians to look at the ways in which scientific practices were allied with the needs and motivations of their context. Hessen's work focused on socio-political factors in what science is done, and how. 

This method of doing the history of science that became known as externalism looks at the manner in which science and scientists are affected, and guided by, their context and the world in which they exist. It is an approach which eschews the notion that the history of science is the development of pure thought over time, one idea leading to another in a contextual bubble which could exist at any place, at any time, if only given the right geniuses.

The method of doing history of science which preceded externalism, became known as internalism. Internalist histories of science often focus on the rational reconstruction of scientific ideas and consider the development of these ideas wholly within the scientific world. Although internalist histories of modern science tend to emphasize the norms of modern science, internalist histories can also consider the different systems of thought underlying the development of Babylonian astronomy or Medieval impetus theory.

In practice, the line between internalism and externalism can be incredibly fuzzy. Few historians then, or now, would insist that either of these approaches in their extremes paint a wholly complete picture, nor would it necessarily be possible to practice one fully over the other. However, at their heart they contain a basic question about the nature of science: what is the relationship between the producers and consumers of scientific knowledge? The answer to this question must, in some form, inform the method in which the history of science and technology is conducted; conversely, how the history of science and technology is conducted, and what it concludes, can inform the answer to the question. The question itself contains an entire host of philosophical questions: what is the nature of scientific truth? What does objectivity mean in a scientific context? How does change in scientific theories occur?

The historian/sociologist of science Robert K. Merton produced many works following Hessen's thesis, which can be seen as reactions to and refinements of Hessen's argument. In his work on science, technology, and society in the 17th-century England, Merton sought to introduce an additional category — Puritanism — to explain the growth of science in this period. Merton split Hessen's category of economics into smaller subcategories of influence, including transportation, mining, and military technique. Merton also tried to develop empirical, quantitative approaches to showing the influence of external factors on science.

Even with his emphasis on external factors, Merton differed from Hessen in his interpretation: Merton maintained that while researchers may be inspired and interested by problems which were suggested by extra-scientific factors, ultimately the researcher's interests were driven by "the internal history of the science in question". Merton attempted to delineate externalism and internalism along disciplinary boundaries, with context studied by the sociologist of science, and content by the historian.

Historiographical approaches to theory change in science 

A major subject of concern and controversy in the philosophy of science has been the nature of paradigm shift or theory change in science. Karl Popper argued that scientific knowledge is progressive and cumulative; Thomas Kuhn, that scientific knowledge moves through "paradigm shifts" and is not necessarily progressive; and Paul Feyerabend, that scientific knowledge is not cumulative or progressive and that there can be no demarcation in terms of method between science and any other form of investigation.

Thought collectives 
In 1935, Ludwik Fleck, a Polish medical microbiologist publishedGenesis and Development of a Scientific Fact. Fleck's book focused on the epistemological and linguistic factors that affect scientific discovery, innovation and progress or development. 

It used a case study in the field of medicine (of the development of the disease concept of Syphilis) to present a thesis about the social nature of knowledge, and in particular science and scientific "thought styles" (Denkstil), which are the epistemological, conceptual and linguistic styles of scientific (but also non-scientific) 'thought collectives' (Denkkollektiv). Fleck's book suggests that epistemologically, there is nothing stable or realistically true or false about any scientific fact. A fact has a "genesis" which is grounded in certain theoretic grounds and many times other obscure and fuzzy notions, and it "develops" as it is subject to dispute and additional research by other scientists. 

Fleck's monograph was published at almost the same time as Karl Popper's Logik der Forschung but unlike Popper's work, the book received no review notice in Isis. However, Thomas S. Kuhn acknowledged the influence it had upon the Structure of Scientific Revolutions. Kuhn also wrote the foreword to Fleck's English translation.

Falsifiability 
Popper coined the term "critical rationalism" to describe his philosophy. He distinguished between verification and falsifiability and said that a theory should be considered scientific if, and only if, it is falsifiable. Popper sought to explain the apparent progress of scientific knowledge in All Life is Problem Solving. Popper suggested that our understanding of the universe seems to improve over time because of an evolutionary process. He proposed that the process of "error elimination" in the field of science is like that of natural selection for biological evolution, whereby theories that better survive the process of refutation are not necessarily more "true" but more "fit" or applicable to the problem situation at hand. Popper suggested that the evolution of theories through the scientific method could reflect a certain type of progress: toward more and more interesting problems. 

Popper helped to establish the philosophy of science as an autonomous discipline within philosophy, through his own prolific and influential works, and also through his influence on his own contemporaries and students.

Revolutions 
The mid 20th century saw a series of studies investigating the role of science in a social context. The sociology of science focused on the ways in which scientists work, looking closely at the ways in which they "produce" and "construct" scientific knowledge. 

Thomas Kuhn's The Structure of Scientific Revolutions (1962) is considered particularly influential. It opened the study of science to new disciplines by suggesting that the evolution of science was in part sociologically determined and that positivism did not explain the actual interactions and strategies of the human participants in science.

As Kuhn put it, the history of science may be seen in more nuanced terms, such as that of competing paradigms or conceptual systems in a wider matrix that includes intellectual, cultural, economic and political themes outside of science. "Partly by selection and partly by distortion, the scientists of earlier ages are implicitly presented as having worked upon the same set of fixed problems and in accordance with the same set of fixed canons that the most recent revolution in scientific theory and method made seem scientific."

In 1965, Gerd Buchdahl wrote "A Revolution in Historiography of Science", referring to the studies of Thomas Kuhn and Joseph Agassi. He suggested that these two writers had inaugurated the sub-discipline by distinguishing clearly between the history and the historiography of science, as they argued that historiographical views greatly influence the writing of the history of science. 

Further studies, such as Jerome Ravetz's Scientific Knowledge and its Social Problems (1971) referred to the role of the scientific community, as a social construct, in accepting or rejecting (objective) scientific knowledge.

Since the 1960s, a common trend in science studies (the study of the sociology and history of science) has been to emphasize the "human component" of scientific knowledge, and to de-emphasize the view that scientific data are self-evident, value-free, and context-free.  The field of Science and Technology Studies, an area that overlaps and often informs historical studies of science, focuses on the social context of science in both contemporary and historical periods. 

Corresponding with the rise of the environmentalism movement and a general loss of optimism of the power of science and technology unfettered to solve the problems of the world, this new history encouraged many critics to pronounce the preeminence of science to be overthrown.

Science wars

The Science wars of the 1990s were about the influence of especially French philosophers, which denied the objectivity of science in general or seemed to do so. They described as well differences between the idealized model of a pure science and the actual scientific practice; while scientism, a revival of the positivism approach, saw in precise measurement and rigorous calculation the basis for finally settling enduring metaphysical and moral controversies.

History of science in the 21st Century 

The discipline today encompasses a wide variety of fields of academic study, ranging from the traditional ones of history, sociology, and philosophy, and a variety of others such as law, architecture, and literature. There is a tendency towards integrating with global history, as well as employing new methodological concepts such as cross-cultural exchange. Historians of science also closely work with scholars from related disciplines such as the history of medicine and science and technology studies.

Questioning postmodernism 
Some critical theorists later argued that their postmodern deconstructions had at times been counter-productive, and had provided intellectual ammunition for reactionary interests. Bruno Latour noted that "dangerous extremists are using the very same argument of social construction to destroy hard-won evidence that could save our lives. Was I wrong to participate in the invention of this field known as science studies? Is it enough to say that we did not really mean what we meant?"

Eurocentrism in the historiography of science
Eurocentrism in scientific history are historical accounts written about the development of modern science that attribute all scholarly, technological, and philosophical gains to Europe and marginalize outside contributions. Until Joseph Needham's book series Science and Civilisation in China began in 1954, many historians would write about modern science solely as a European achievement with no significant contributions from civilizations other than the Greeks. Recent historical writings have argued that there was significant influence and contribution from Egyptian, Mesopotamian, Arabic, Indian, and Chinese astronomy and mathematics. The employment of notions of cross-cultural exchange in the study of history of science helps in putting the discipline on the path towards being a non-Eurocentric and non-linear field of study.

See also 
Conflict thesis
Logology (science)
Metascience
Military funding of science
Theories and sociology of the history of science

References

Bibliography
Agassi, Joseph. Towards an Historiography of Science Wesleyan University Press. 1963

Dennis, Michael Aaron. "Historiography of Science: An American Perspective," in John Krige and Dominique Pestre, eds., Science in the Twentieth Century, Amsterdam: Harwood, 1997, pp. 1–26.
von Engelhardt, Dietrich. Historisches Bewußtsein in der Naturwissenschaft : von der Aufklärung bis zum Positivismus, Freiburg [u.a.] : Alber, 1979.
.
Fleck, Ludwik, Genesis and Development of a Scientific Fact, Chicago and London: The University of Chicago Press, 1979.
Graham, Loren R. "Soviet attitudes towards the social and historical study of science," in Science in Russia and the Soviet Union: A Short History, Cambridge, England: Cambridge University Press, 1993, pp. 137–155.
Kragh, Helge. An Introduction to the Historiography of Science,  Cambridge University Press 1990
Kuhn, Thomas. The Structure of Scientific Revolutions, Chicago: University of Chicago, 1962 (third edn, 1996).
Gavroglu, Kostas. O Passado das Ciências como História, Porto: Porto Editora, 2007.
Golinski, Jan. Making Natural Knowledge: Constructivism and the History of Science, 2nd ed. with a new Preface. Princeton: University Press, 2005.
Lakatos, Imre. "History of Science and its Rational Reconstructions" in Y.Elkana (ed.) The Interaction between Science and Philosophy,  pp. 195–241, Atlantic Highlands, New Jersey: Humanities Press and also published in Mathematics Science and Epistemology: Volume 2 of the Philosophical and Scientific Papers of Imre Lakatos Papers Imre Lakatos, Worrall & Currie (eds), Cambridge University Press, 1980

 
Raina, Dhruv. Images and Contexts Critical Essays on the Historiography of Science in India, Oxford University Press 2003
Rossi, Paolo, I ragni e le formiche: un'apologia della storia della scienza, Bologna, 1986.

.
Transversal: International Journal for the Historiography of Science

External links

 
Philosophy of science